Pigeon Pass Valley, is a valley in Riverside County, California.

References

Valleys of Riverside County, California